Leslie Bevis (born February 13, 1954) is an American model and actress, best known for playing Captain Rionoj on Star Trek: Deep Space Nine.

Career
Bevis worked as a model in Europe before her work in film and television. Besides making several appearances on Star Trek: Deep Space Nine, she has made numerous other television appearances, such as in Matlock, V, Dallas, Street Hawk, Night Court, Falcon Crest, MacGyver, Hunter and Murder, She Wrote. Bevis is perhaps best known for the role of Ruth Perkins in The Young and the Restless, which she played in 1998 and 1999.

She has also had minor roles in feature films such as Commanderette Zircon in Spaceballs, Cassandra in Alien Nation, and a news reporter in The Opposite of Sex.

Personal life
Bevis married then Cincinnati Bengals punter and wide receiver Pat McInally in 1984. They have two children and reside in Seal Beach, California.

References

External links

1954 births
Actresses from Washington, D.C.
American film actresses
American television actresses
Living people
20th-century American actresses
21st-century American women